Marilyn Tesch is an Australian former professional tennis player.

A native of Bundaberg, Queensland, Tesch was a two-time Australian Open doubles quarter-finalist. She also made the mixed doubles fourth round at Wimbledon in 1973 with Anand Amritraj, where they lost in three sets to Jimmy Connors and Chris Evert. Her best singles result at grand slam level was a third round appearance at the 1973 Australian Open.

Tesch, who is now known by her married name Rasmussen, was runner-up to Evonne Goolagong at the 1970 Australian Hard Court Championships. In 1978 she had the distinction of winning both of New Zealand's national titles.

References

External links
 
 

Year of birth missing (living people)
Living people
Australian female tennis players
Tennis people from Queensland
Sportspeople from Bundaberg